Nilachala, also rendered Niladri refers to a region corresponding to Puri, in the Indian state of Odisha.

Description 

Nilachala is a place of religious significance in Hinduism and is one of the four centres of pilgrimage called the Char Dhams. Religious teachers like Ramanuja and Vishnuswami are regarded to have visited Nilachala in the twelfth-century and established monasteries, referred to as mathas. The theologian Nimbarka is believed to have visited the city of Purti, and the saint Chaitanya is believed to have spent eighteen years at Nilachala.

According to the Skanda Purana, King Indradyumna of Avanti is said to have dreamt of the deity Nilamadhava. The king is regarded to have dispatched many priests and messengers in the search of this elusive deity, regarded as a form of Vishnu. Finally, Vidyapati, one of the priests of Indradyumna, located the image of Nilamadhava at Nilachala, at the sacred region of Purushottama Kshetra, and took the news back to the king. The image of the deity vanished before Indradyumna's arrival. After being propitiated, Vishnu is stated to have offered instructions for the construction of the Jagannath temple of Puri, also in Nilachala. 

Geographically, though, there is no such apparent geographic structure at Puri, the township being located at the coastal plains of eastern Odisha. Such a reference to a seemingly non-existent mountain has been a matter of debate.

Hypotheses

Hypothesis 1
Indologist and Jagannath cult researcher, Heinrich von Stietencron in "The Advent of Vishnuism in Orissa: An Outline of its History According to Archaeological and Epigraphical Sources from the Gupta Period up to 1135 AD." in A. Eschmann et al., The Cult of Jagannath and the Regional Tradition of Orissa, Delhi: Manohar, pp. 1–30, hypothesizes the actual existence of a mountain at Puri in the past and notes the following:

Yet contrary to such an opinion, the platform of the Jagannath temple, seems to be a totally man-made monument, not a modified natural hill. The Nilachala consists almost entirely of a platform, and at its north—western foot lies an artificial cave. This is approximately 25 feet below the level of the inner enclosure, for a staircase of about twenty two steps leads down to the sanctum of deity Pataleshvara Shiva, and gives some idea of the level of the original terrain. The site was obviously exposed to flooding during the monsoon season as once the river touched its lowest steps when it flowed in the broad road just in front of the temp

Hypothesis 2
Another hypothesis regarding the naming of Puri as 'Nilachala' has been advanced by the noted historian, Dr. Krushna Chandra Panigrahi, in his "History of Orissa", pp. 338–339. It has been argued that no mountain existed at the Jagannath shrine, and:

""Then the Bhaumas came from Assam in the first part of the eighth century A.D., ruled over Orissa, obtained the shrine from the Savaras, got the temple built on the spot and gave it the name Nilachala, which was the name of the famous shrine of Kamakhya in their homeland of Assam."."

In the 19th century, certain scholars have imagined that the Nilachala (Blue Hill) concealed the debris of a former Buddhist monument named Dantapura. However, Puri cannot be identified with Dantapura and so far no Buddhist remains have been discovered there.

See also
 "Nilachaley Mahaprabhu"- Biopic of Chaitanya Mahaprabhu

References

Sources 
 
Shri Jaganath Temple at Puri
Das, Bikram: Domain Of Jagannath - A Historical Study, BR Publishing Corporation.
Das, Suryanarayan: Jagannath Through the Ages, Sanbun Publishers, New Delhi. (2010) 
Eschmann, A., H. Kulke and G.C. Tripathi (Ed.): The Cult of Jagannath and the Regional Tradition of Orissa, 1978, Manohar, Delhi.
Hunter, W.W. Orissa: The Vicissitudes of an Indian Province under Native and British Rule, Vol. I, Chapter-III, 1872.
Kulke, Hermann in The Anthropology of Values, Berger Peter (ed.): Yayati Kesari revisited, Dorling Kindrsley Pvt. Ltd., (2010).
Mahapatra, K.N.: Antiquity of Jagannath Puri as a place of pilgrimage, OHRJ, Vol.III, No.1, April, 1954, p. 17.
Mishra, K.C.: The Cult of Jagannath, Calcutta, 1971.
Mishra, Narayan and Durga Nandan: Annals and antiquities of the temple of Jagannath, Sarup & Sons, New Delhi, 2005. 
Panigrahi, K. C.: History of Orissa, Kitab Mahal, Cuttack, 2nd ed. (1981)
Patnaik, H.S.: Jagannath, His Temple, Cult and Festivals, Aryan Books International, New Delhi, 1994, .
Patnaik, N.: Sacred Geography of Puri : Structure and Organisation and Cultural Role of a Pilgrim Centre, Year: 2006, 
Starza-Majewski, Olgierd M. L: The Jagannatha temple at Puri and its Deities, Amsterdam, 1983.
Starza-Majewski, Olgierd Maria Ludwik: The Jagannatha Temple At Puri: Its Architecture, Art And Cult, E.J. Brill   (Leiden and New York). [1993] 
Stietencron, Heinrich von: "The Advent of Vishnuism in Orissa: An Outline of its History According to Archaeological and Epigraphical Sources from the Gupta Period up to 1135 AD." in Eschmann, A. et al., The Cult of Jagannath and the Regional Tradition of Orissa, Delhi: Manohar, pp. 1–30

Jagannath
Hinduism in Odisha